Several ships have been named Charlton:

 (or Charleton) was built in America. She first appeared in British-origin online records in 1803. She made three complete voyages as a whaler. She was on her fourth voyage when the U.S. Navy captured her. After her captors released her she returned to England and then disappears from easily accessible online records.
 was launched in Liverpool as an East Indiaman for the British East India Company (EIC). She made five voyages to India for the EIC. A French naval squadron captured her in 1809 on her sixth voyage and she became a prison ship at Mauritius until the Royal Navy recaptured her at the end of 1810. She became a country ship, trading east of the Cape of Good Hope, but was lost in the Red Sea in 1812.

Ship names